Mahmudabad (also Romanized as Maḩmūdābād; also known as Maḩmūdābād-e Vābasteh Beh Khabr) is a village in Khabar Rural District, Dehaj District, Shahr-e Babak County, Kerman Province, Iran. At the 2006 census, its population was 37, in 5 families.

References 

Populated places in Shahr-e Babak County